Wilhelm Lehmbruck (4 January 188125 March 1919) was a German sculptor. One of the most important of his generation, he was influenced by realism and expressionism.

Biography
Born in Meiderich (part of Duisburg from 1905), he was the fourth of eight children born to the miner Wilhelm Lehmbruck and his wife Margaretha. He was able to study sculpture arts at the School of Applied Arts in Düsseldorf by a stipend from the municipal authorities. In 1899 he began to make a living by doing illustrations for scientific publications. He trained at the Kunstakademie Düsseldorf and is associated with the Düsseldorf school of painting from 1901 to 1906. On leaving the academy Lehmbruck worked as an independent artist in Düsseldorf. He exhibited for the first time at the Deutsche Kunstausstellung, in Cologne in 1906. He was impressed by the sculptures of Auguste Rodin, and traveled to England, Italy, the Netherlands, and Paris. In 1907, he married Anita Kaufmann, and they had three sons.

In 1912, Lehmbruck exhibited in the Folkwang Museum in Hagen, with Egon Schiele. In 1914, he had his first solo exhibition in Paris, at the Galerie Levesque. He contributed to an exhibition at the Grand Palais in Paris. From 1910–1914 he lived in Paris. He frequented the Café du Dôme, where he met sculptors such as Modigliani, Brâncuși, and Archipenko.

During World War I he served as a paramedic at a military hospital in Berlin. The suffering and misery he saw there are reflected in his late sculptures such as Fallen Man (1915–16). He suffered from severe depression and fled the war by going to Zürich at the end of 1916. There he made contact with the socialist, L. Rubiner, who collaborated on Franz Pfemfert's Aktion. He was elected to the Prussian Academy of Arts in Berlin in early 1919. After the war, he returned to Berlin where he committed suicide on 25 March 1919.

Sculpture 
Lehmbruck's sculptures mostly concentrate on the human body and are influenced by Naturalism and Expressionism. His works, including female nudes, are marked by a sense of melancholy and an elongation of form common to Gothic architecture.

Throughout his career, architect Ludwig Mies van der Rohe placed his friend Lehmbruck's sculptures and those of Aristide Maillol into his buildings and designs.

Collections
The Lehmbruck Museum (Duisburg, Germany) has in its collection about 100 sculptures, 40 paintings, 900 drawings and 200 graphical works by Wilhelm Lehmbruck. The museum, named after Wilhelm Lehmbruck, was originally designed by his son, Manfred Lehmbruck (1913–1992).
 
The Honolulu Museum of Art, the Museum of Modern Art (New York City), the National Gallery of Art (Washington D.C.), Städel Museum (Frankfurt, Germany), the Neue Nationalgalerie (Berlin, Germany) and the Tate Gallery (London, England) are among the public collections holding works by Wilhelm Lehmbruck. One of his sculptures can be seen in the Villa Tugendhat.

Gallery

See also
Lehmbruck-Museum

References

Further reading
 August Hoff. Wilhelm Lehmbruck, Berlin: Klinkhardt & Biermann, 1933 (German).
 Werner Hofmann, Wilhelm Lehmbruck. London: Zwemmer 1958
 August Hoff, Wilhelm Lehmbruck: life and work. New York: Praeger 1969 
 Reinhold Heller (ed.), The art of Wilhelm Lehmbruck, Washington, National Gallery of Art, 1972
 Marion Bornscheuer; Raimund Stecker (eds.); Kneeling woman 100 years. Wilhelm Lehmbruck with Matisse, Brancusi, Debussy, Archipenko, Rodin, Nijinsky in Paris 1911. Lehmbruck  Museum Duisburg. Cologne: DuMont Buchverlag, 2011, 
 Hans-Peter Wipplinger (ed.); Wilhelm Lehmbruck. Retrospektive/Retrospective.  Leopold Museum Vienna, Cologne: Walther König 2016,

Catalogue raisonné
 Erwin Petermann [ed..], Die Druckgraphik von Wilhelm Lehmbruck. Verzeichnis. Stuttgart: Hatje, 1964
 Gerhard Händler, Wilhelm Lehmbruck. Die Zeichnungen der Reifezeit. Stuttgart: Hatje, 1985, 
 Margarita C. Lahusen, Wilhelm Lehmbruck. Gemälde und großformatige Zeichnungen. Munich: Hirmer, 1997, .
 Dietrich Schubert, Wilhelm Lehmbruck – Catalogue raisonné der Skulpturen (1898–1919).  Worms: Wernersche Verlagsgesellschaft, 2001, .

External links

 
 Lehmbruck Museum in Duisburg

1881 births
1919 deaths
Sculptors who committed suicide
Modern sculptors
German male sculptors
20th-century sculptors
People from Duisburg
People from the Rhine Province
Suicides in Germany
1919 suicides